Lee Wallard (September 7, 1910 Schenectady, New York – November 29, 1963 St. Petersburg, Florida ) was an American race car driver. In the 1951 Indianapolis 500 Wallard drove the Number 99 Belanger Special to victory, at age 40. Tony Bettenhausen had passed up the car, because he wanted to drive a newer front-wheel drive vehicle.  A week after winning the Indianapolis 500, Wallard was injured during an auto race in Reading, PA.  He was severely burned when his race car caught fire in the home stretch of that race.  He required 27 skin grafts.

Complete AAA Championship Car results

Indianapolis 500 results

Complete Formula One World Championship results
(key) (Races in italics indicate fastest lap)

References

1910 births
1963 deaths
Indianapolis 500 drivers
Indianapolis 500 winners
Sportspeople from Schenectady, New York
Racing drivers from New York (state)
AAA Championship Car drivers
Formula One race winners